Lamanabi Trappist Monastery is a monastery complex of the Catholic Order of Cistercians of the Strict Observance (O.C.S.O.), popularly known as the Trappists, located in East Flores, East Nusa Tenggara, Indonesia. The monastery was officially established on 1996 as a daughter house of Rawaseneng Monastery in Temanggung Regency, Central Java.

Following the Rule of Saint Benedict, like any nuns or monks in other Trappist monasteries, the monks of Lamanabi live independently by doing various manual works to feed themselves, such as producing candles, and doing all of the household works by themselves.

Lamanabi Monastery is known as the "choice of pilgrim" seeking "silence and peace", with Frans Seda and some of the Kompas Gramedia's executives reportedly had made a "pilgrimage" to the monastery.

Superiors 
Superiors of the community since the official establishment in 1996:
 1996 : Mikael Santana, OCSO (Superior)
 2005 – 2017 : Mikael Santana, OCSO (Prior)

See also 
 Bunda Pemersatu Monastery in Semarang Regency
 Diocese of Larantuka
 Enclosed religious orders

References

External links 
 
 Cistercian Order Is Growing in Africa and Asia, ZENIT
 , the monks of Lamanabi singing Christmas Hymns, in Indonesian

Trappist monasteries in Indonesia